The 2012–13 Slovenian Hockey League season was the 22nd season of the Slovenian Hockey League, the top level of ice hockey in Slovenia. Three teams participated in the regular season, which was won by Mladi Jesenice. For the playoffs, the three teams from the regular season were joined by Olimpija, which had participated in the Erste Bank Eishockey Liga during the regular season, and Triglav Kranj and Slavija, which had both played in the Inter-National League during the regular season. Olimpija won the play-off championship by defeating Slavija in the final.

Regular season

Play-offs

External links
Season on Hokej.si

1
Slovenia
Slovenian Ice Hockey League seasons